Raab is a market town in the district of Schärding in Upper Austria.

Raab may also refer to:
 A river in Austria and Hungary, where it is known as Rába
 German name for the city of Győr in Hungary, where the Rába flows into the Danube
 Battle of Raab, fought in 1809 near Győr
Raab (surname)
Broccoli raab or rapini, an edible vegetable used in Chinese and Italian cuisine
Raab-Katzenstein,  German aircraft manufacturer 
3184 Raab, an asteroid

See also
Raabe